Raza Iqbal (born 17 June 1986) is a Pakistani-born Norwegian cricketer who plays for Norway. He played for Norway the 2015 ICC World Cricket League Division Six tournament in England, captaining the side. He also played for Norway in Group C of the 2018–19 ICC T20 World Cup Europe Qualifier tournament in the Netherlands.

In May 2019, he was named as the captain of Norway's squad for the Regional Finals of the 2018–19 ICC T20 World Cup Europe Qualifier tournament in Guernsey. He made his Twenty20 International (T20I) debut for Norway against Italy on 15 June 2019.

References

External links
 

1986 births
Living people
Norwegian cricketers
Norway Twenty20 International cricketers
Pakistani emigrants to Norway
People from Jhelum District